Omar Hurricane is a physicist at Lawrence Livermore National Laboratory, in the thermonuclear and inertial confinement fusion design division. Prior to Lawrence Livermore, he worked at the UCLA Institute of Plasma & Fusion Research. His research focuses on weapons physics, high energy density physics (HEDP) science, the theory of plasmas, and plasma instability.

Education

Dr. Hurricane attained his B.S in Physics and Applied Math from Met. State College in Denver in 1990. He graduated with an MS in physics from University of California, Los Angeles in 1992, and gained his PhD from UCLA as well in 1994.

Career
Following numerous internships, Omar Hurricane began his professional career as a postdoctoral fellow at UCLA. He then went on to become the senior scientist at UCLA's Institute of Plasma Fusion and research. He is currently a Program Leader at the Lawrence Livermore National Laboratory.    

He has published widely in journals and conference papers. Hurricane was the lead author of a 2014 paper presenting the results of fusion experiments demonstrating Fuel Gain greater than unity. He received the Edward Teller Award in 2021.

References

Living people
21st-century American physicists
Lawrence Livermore National Laboratory staff
University of California, Los Angeles faculty
Year of birth missing (living people)